Lanemark Football Club was based in the town of New Cumnock, and was one of a number of football clubs formed in the late nineteenth century in and around the Ayrshire coalfield. The club took its name from the Lanemark Coal Company which was formed in 1865 to work coal in the vicinity of Lanemark Farm in New Cumnock. As the coal industry grew so did the demand for workers, so the coal company built small basic houses in terraces known as “rows” in the South Boag area of the town.

The original Lanemark F.C. was founded in 1877 and played their home games at Connel Park, South Boag, which was opposite Knockshinnoch Pit. As a senior Scottish club they were entitled to enter the Scottish Cup although their record was poor, and when the club folded in 1882, they had never progressed beyond the first round.

A second Lanemark F.C. was formed three years later in 1885, and again played their home games at Connel Park. The club strip was blue shirts with either navy blue or white shorts.

In 1892 Lanemark joined the new South of Scotland Football League but the League collapsed in disarray, in no small measure due to the inability or unwillingness of Lanemark to arrange League fixtures. A 1–9 defeat in their first game may explain this reluctance.

The next season the club returned to their normal diet of friendlies and local Cup competitions, of which there were many. Their one season of note in the Scottish Cup came in the 1888–89 season when Lanemark reached the fourth round before losing 0–8 at Connel Park to a powerful Renton side.

The early years of the twentieth century saw Lanemark competing in the North Ayrshire Football League, then the Ayrshire and Renfrewshire Football League and finally the Scottish Combination. After the Ayrshire Cup was won in 1907, the club began to struggle financially and in 1920 the club was formally dissolved.

A new junior club, New Cumnock United, was formed later that same year, also based at Connel Park, but disbanded in 1928. In 1930 the current Western Super League side Glenafton Athletic was formed and their early years were also spent at Connel Park, before moving to their current ground, Loch Park, in 1960.

Players
see

References 

Sources
Pagan, Malcolm. Senior Non League Football in South West Scotland. Stewart Davidson, Paisley. 1996

Defunct football clubs in Scotland
Association football clubs established in 1885
Association football clubs disestablished in 1920
1885 establishments in Scotland
1920 disestablishments in Scotland
South of Scotland Football League teams
Football in East Ayrshire
New Cumnock
Mining association football teams in Scotland